Kaukura or Kaheko is an atoll in the Tuamotu group in French Polynesia,  long and  wide. The closest land is Apataki Atoll,  to the northeast.

The northern reef rim is narrow, while the southern is broad. There are two groups of 65 islets. It has only one navigable pass cutting through the reef.

The most important island is Motu Panao, in the atoll's northwest. Kaukura has 475 inhabitants ; the main village is Raitahiti.

Geographically Kaukura belongs to the Palliser Islands (Îles Palliser) subgroup of the Tuamotus.

History
The first recorded European to arrive to Kaukura was Dutch Navigator Jakob Roggeveen on his expedition for the Dutch West India Company to seek Terra Australis in 1722.

Formerly, fishing was the main occupation of Kaukura's islanders. But presently, tourism has replaced the traditional activities as a source of income.

There is a small airport at Kaukura which was opened in 1994.

Administration
Kaukura belongs to the commune of Arutua. The commune of Arutua consists of Arutua, as well as the atolls of Apataki and Kaukura.

See also
Kaukura Airport

References

External links
Atoll list (in French)
Maps of Kaukura

Atolls of the Tuamotus